Maxim Valerievich Viktorov (June 22, 1972, Moscow) is a Russian public figure, lawyer, philanthropist. Member of the Public Chamber of Russia, first deputy chairman of the Presidium of the Russian Association for the Advancement of Science.  Viktorov was an advisor for the Russian Defense Ministry in the past. He is chairman of the Board of Investment Programs Foundation and managing partner at Legal Intelligence Group, a law firm. Viktorov is a founder of the Moscow International Paganini Violin Competition, a professor of NRU-HSE (National Research University Higher School of Economics).

By the Presidential Decree was appointed a member of the Public Chamber of Russian Federation. he was worked in the Management of Sibir Energy company and was a personal adviser of Dmitry Medvedev, when he was a candidate to the Presidency.

Biography 

 Born June 22, 1972 in Moscow
 In 1997 he graduated from the Law Faculty of Moscow State University named after M. Lomonosov
 From 1989 till 1990 – Fellow of the Investigative Department of the RSFSR Prosecutor
 From 1991 till 1992, at age 19, was drafted to the armed forces of the Federal Agency for Governmental Communications and Information 
 From 1992 till 1996 – Legal assistant to the chairman of the Moscow Region Government
 Since 1996, the managing partner of Legal Intelligence Group (Partner: Professor Makovskiy A.L., Professor Sukhanov E.A.) 
 In February 1998 he was appointed executive secretary of the council on banks and banking activities to the governor of Moscow region
 In 1998 on the proposal of the governor of the Moscow Region was elected deputy chairman of the Election Commission of the Moscow region
 Since 1999 – chairman of the board of investment programs, implementing a number of innovative and research projects, primarily in the global world trends and risks 
 From 2000 till 2003 – member of the advisory council on National Security  Issues of the Federal Assembly – Parliament of the Russian Federation
 From 2005 till 2008 – deputy chairman of the advisory Council of Mass Communications at the Ministry of Culture and Mass Communications of Russian Federation
 Since 2006 – member of the board of trustees of Moscow Suvorov Military School. Member of the board of trustees of the Foundation of His Royal Highness  Prince Michael of Kent.
 From 2007 till 2009 – member of the board of trustees of the State Academic Bolshoi Theatre of Russia
 Since 2008 – member of the Public Chamber of Russian Federation, member of the Commission on Science and Innovation 
 Since 2009 – member of the Public Advancement Committee of Russian Libraries
 Since 2009 – chairman of the editorial board of scientific and journalistic magazine "Union Magazine», illuminates the problems of global development global trends and key risks
 From 2009 till 2011 – trustee of the Pushkin State Museum of Fine Arts
 From 2009 till 2011 – member of the board of directors of OJSC "Moscow Oil and Gas Company", OJSC "Moscow Oil Refinery", Moscow NPZ Holdings BV and Sibir Energy PLC, JSC "KSK", the chairman of the board of directors of the corporation Evocorp
 Since 2011 – member of the council for the Promotion of Russian Olympic Committee
 Since 2011 – the first deputy chairman of the Russian public organization "Russian Association for the Advancement of Science" (AAAS analogue USA), founded by the same year by Viktorov, Academician E. Velikhov, Nobel Prize winner Zhores I. Alferov and  Academician V. Chereshnev and others.
 Since 2017, Viktorov has owned 92.6% of the Evocorp Management Company, which, in particular, is engaged in some of Arkady Rotenberg's projects. In the spring of 2020, Evocorp gained fame as one of the shareholders of the manufacturer of COVID tests, which the media tried to associate with the inner circle of Vladimir Putin.

Fund investment programs 

Foundation with the support of the president and with the assistance of the Ministry of Culture has a number of humanitarian projects at the federal and regional significance. Foundation under the leadership of Maxim Viktorov assists its scholarship, including the children who died while on duty servicemen and law enforcement officials.

In 2007, the Fund began a construction project in Moscow Cultural and Educational Center "Art House", consisting of a concert hall and art galleries. 
From 2007 to present: The foundation organizes concerts, which are unique events worldwide. September 1, 2007 to celebrate the 860th anniversary of Moscow Fund organized concert "Masterpieces of Art of the Violin on Red Square", in March 2008, the foundation held a series of concerts "Ex-Vieuxtemps in Moscow."

In November 2008 Maxim Viktorov organized a concert "Homage Guarneri del Gesu." November 30, 2008 with the participation of Maxim Viktorov there was the grand opening of the "December Nights of Sviatoslav Richter" in the Pushkin State Museum of Fine Arts.

In September 2010, within the framework of the International Military Music Festival "Spasskaya Tower" in the Alexander Hall of the Moscow Kremlin Fund conducted a concert of classical music.

Moscow International Paganini Violin Competition 

In 2003, the Maxim Viktorov established Moscow International Paganini Violin Competition. TV channel CNN reported from the first contest: "The Moscow Violin Competition once again had shown the world that music education in Russia – one of the best in the world." Over the years, become contestants from more than 40 countries.

Moscow Suvorov Military School 

In 2007, the Maxim Viktorov, as a member of the board of trustees of the Moscow Suvorov Military School, sponsored large-scale works to improve facilities training facilities the school, as well as under the patronage of Viktorov built a new sports complex.

Russian Public Chamber 

Viktorov is responsible for interaction with the Public Chamber of the OSCE on the most pressing issues of implementation of international agreements of the Russian Federation, including with the Special Representative and coordinator of the OSCE to combat trafficking in persons.

Legislative and advisory activities 

He participated in the drafting of legislation relating to the amendment of existing legislation with a view to countering and preventing unlawful seizure of property complexes. He is an author of a number of analytical materials, reflecting trends in crime in the area of abuse of insider information, manipulation of prices in the organized market, crime in the area of corporate governance. Legal Research Group under the leadership of Viktorov provides an international expertise, including with experts from Harvard University, and organized interaction Investigative Committee of the Russian Interior Ministry with the representatives of the U.S. Federal Bureau of Investigation.

Awards and commendations 

He was awarded the medal "for military cooperation", the medal "In commemoration of the 850th anniversary of Moscow", the other state and public awards and awards from foreign countries. He has Russian FSB commendations.

Collecting 

Viktorov possesses Russia's largest private collection of unique musical instruments including Alessandro Gagliano, Carlo Tononi, Jacob Steiner, Carlo Bergonzi, Antonio Stradivari, Giuseppe Guarneri Del Gesu's violins.

References

Living people
1972 births
Russian bankers
Politicians  from Moscow
Lawyers from Moscow
Academic staff of the Higher School of Economics
Members of the Civic Chamber of the Russian Federation